Saint-Hippolyte-de-Montaigu (Provençal: Sent Ipolit de Montagut) is a commune in the Gard department in southern France.

Population

See also
Communes of the Gard department

References

Communes of Gard